Hausen bei Würzburg is a municipality in the district of Würzburg in Bavaria in Germany. Hausen was founded in 1194, and has a total population of about 800 residents.

Twin towns
Hausen bei Würzburg is twinned with Villerville (France).

References

Würzburg (district)